The Anzhu Islands or Anjou Islands are an archipelago and geographical subgroup of the New Siberian Islands archipelago. They are located between the Laptev Sea and the East Siberian Sea in the Russian Arctic Ocean.

Etymology
The Anzhu Islands are named after Russian explorer Pyotr Anjou, a Russian-born descendant of Protestant refugees from the French province of Anjou.

Geography
The total area of the islands is approx. 29,000 km².

This island group is a practically uninhabited territory. It belongs administratively to Yakutia, Russian Federation.

Main islands
The main islands of the Anzhu Islands archipelago are, from west to east:

Belkovsky Island.
Kotelny Island
Bunge Land
Faddeyevsky Island
New Siberia

References

Location of the Anzhu Islands

External links

 
Archipelagoes of the East Siberian Sea
Archipelagoes of the Laptev Sea
New Siberian Islands
Archipelagoes of the Sakha Republic
Islands of Siberia
Uninhabited islands of Russia